Field effect may refer to: relative influence of electricity to the substrate within a given field.

 Field effect (chemistry), an effect that a pole (either an unipole or dipole) has on a remote reaction centre (reaction rates, equilibrium). This effect operates through space not through bonds which distinguishes it from the inductive effect.
 Field effect (semiconductor), the physical mechanism modulating the conductivity of a semiconductor using an applied voltage difference.
 Field effect also known as field cancerization, a field of molecular and cellular changes in normal appearing tissue, which predispose to the development of cancer.
 Wien effect, in electrolytes, an increase in ionic mobility or conductivity of electrolytes at very high gradient of electrical potential.